The 1999 Troy State Trojans football team represented Troy State University—now known as Troy University—as a member of the Southland Football League during the 1999 NCAA Division I-AA football season. The Trojans finished the season ranked No. 6 in the Sports Network poll. The team played home games at Veterans Memorial Stadium in Troy, Alabama.

Schedule

References

Troy State
Troy Trojans football seasons
Southland Conference football champion seasons
Troy State Trojans football